63rd Street and Malvern Avenue station (also known as 63rd and Malvern Loop) is a SEPTA trolley station in Philadelphia. It is the western terminus of Route 10 of the SEPTA Subway–Surface Trolley Lines and northern terminus of SEPTA Bus Route 46. The station loop is located at 63rd Street and Malvern Avenue in the Overbrook neighborhood of West Philadelphia, near Lancaster Avenue. It is also close to the border with Lower Merion Township. Trolleys run from here to Center City Philadelphia. The Overbrook station of the Paoli/Thorndale Line is within walking distance of the station.

SEPTA Bus connections
SEPTA City Buses
Routes 46, 65, and G (Morning peak hours on weekdays only)

SEPTA Suburban Buses 
Route 105

External links 
 

 Station from Google Maps Street View

Railway stations in the United States opened in 1926
SEPTA Subway–Surface Trolley Line stations
Railway stations in Philadelphia